Nenmara State assembly constituency is one of the 140 state legislative assembly constituencies in Kerala state in southern India. It is also one of the 7 state legislative assembly constituencies included in the Alathur Lok Sabha constituency. As of the 2021 Kerala Legislative Assembly election, the current MLA is K. Babu of CPI(M).

Local self governed segments
Nenmara Niyamasabha constituency is composed of the following local self governed segments:

Members of Legislative Assembly
The following list contains all members of Kerala legislative assembly who have represented Nenmara Niyamasabha Constituency during the period of various assemblies:

Key

Election results
Percentage change (±%) denotes the change in the number of votes from the immediate previous election.

Niyama Sabha election 2021

Niyama Sabha election 2016
There were 1,90,765 registered voters in Nenmara Constituency for the 2016 Kerala Niyamasabha election.

Niyamasabha election 2011 
There were 1,72,069 registered voters in the constituency for the 2011 election.

See also
 Nenmara
 Palakkad district
 List of constituencies of the Kerala Legislative Assembly
 2016 Kerala Legislative Assembly election

References 

Assembly constituencies of Kerala

State assembly constituencies in Palakkad district